Akin Gump Strauss Hauer & Feld LLP is an American multinational law firm headquartered in Washington, DC. It is the second-largest lobbying firm in the United States by revenue. Akin Gump has consistently been ranked as among the top law firms in the United States by The American Lawyer. The firm is known for its influence on Capitol Hill and its representation of high-profile clients. With regard to compensation, Akin Gump is ranked by associates as one of the top 10 highest-paying law firms in the country.

History
The firm was founded in Dallas, Texas, in 1945 by Robert Strauss and Richard Gump. It maintains a large presence in Texas with a total of five offices in the state.

In early September 1950, Strauss and Gump added Irving Goldberg and William P. Fonville to the firm, which was then renamed Goldberg, Fonville, Gump & Strauss.

In 1963, Jack Hauer left a competitor to join the firm, which became known as Goldberg, Fonville, Gump, Strauss & Hauer.

Goldberg left the firm in 1966 to accept a federal judgeship on the United States Court of Appeals for the Fifth Circuit. He was replaced by Henry Akin. Fonville's departure—and the ascent to named partner status of Alan Feld, who had joined the firm in 1960—gave the firm the name it currently bears.

In 2012, the firm's partnership elected Kim Koopersmith to serve as the firm's chairperson. She succeeded R. Bruce McLean, who had helmed the firm for 20 years and became the first woman to chair the firm and one of the few women up to that time to head an Am Law 50 law firm.

In 2013, Akin Gump adopted a "single tier" partnership structure, in which all partners have equity, abandoning the more popular "two tier" structure in which many partners have no equity interest.

In 2017, Akin Gump hired its first chief diversity and inclusion officer, Michele Meyer-Shipp, who joined the firm from Prudential Financial. She was succeeded by Nimesh Patel, who joined the firm in February 2019.
 
According to OpenSecrets, Akin Gump was one of the top law firms contributing to federal candidates during the 2012 election cycle, donating $2.56 million, 66% to Democrats.  By comparison, during that same period Kirkland & Ellis donated $2.49 million, 59% to Republicans, while oil conglomerate ExxonMobil donated $2.66 million, 88% to Republicans.  Since 1990, Akin Gump has contributed $19.84 million to federal candidates, and since 2003 has spent $8 million on lobbying.

The firm's clients includes the governments of Japan, South Korea, the Maldives, and Nicaragua. 

The firm has offices in Dallas, Washington, D.C., San Antonio, Houston, Irvine, Fort Worth, New York, Moscow, Philadelphia, London, Los Angeles, San Francisco, Beijing, Hong Kong, Singapore, Abu Dhabi, Dubai, Frankfurt, Geneva and Hartford.

Involvement in Russia investigation
Paul Manafort, a central figure in the 2017 Special Counsel investigation, was being represented by Melissa Laurenza, a partner of the firm. Melissa Laurenza's role in the Russian investigation centers from her representation of Manafort. The United States Office of Special Counsel compelled Melissa Laurenza to testify in the case. In October 2017, "New York University law professor Stephen Gillers said the judge was persuaded that there was significant evidence Manafort and Gates had duped their lawyer into sending inaccurate letters to Justice about their lobbying efforts and about what emails might exist about the work."

Involvement in US presidential impeachment inquiry
In 2019 lawyers from the firm represented Catherine Croft, a US State Department Ukraine specialist, when she gave testimony to the Select Committee on Intelligence, US House of Representatives.

Recognition
In 2020, for the sixth time in seven years, the firm was selected for The American Lawyer's A-List, the annual ranking of the country's 20 leading law firms. 2017 marked the firm's 15th appearance on Corporate Board Member'''s list of the nation's top 20 corporate law firms. In 2019, for the 11th year out of the last 12, Akin Gump was named to The National Law Journal's "Appellate Hot List" of firms that "[won] big in federal and state appeals courts across the country."

Yale Law Women, the largest student organization at Yale Law School, named Akin Gump to its 2019 list of Top 10 Firms for Family Friendliness and, in 2020, as one of only three law firms to its list of Top Firms for Working Mothers and Family Planning. In October 2017, the Minority Corporate Counsel Association presented Akin Gump with the Thomas L. Sager Award in recognition of the firm's "sustained commitment to improving the hiring, retention and promotion of diverse attorneys." (The firm won the award four times previously.) In 2019, for the 12th year in a row, Akin Gump received a perfect score on the Human Rights Campaign's Corporate Equality Index, which rates employers on their treatment of gay, lesbian, bisexual and transgender employees, consumers and investors.
.
Chambers & Partners ranks the firm as top tier in 11 areas of practice around the globe including in bankruptcy/restructuring/insolvency, capital markets: debt, government relations, healthcare and Native American law.

Notable people
Current employees and consultants
Lincoln P. Bloomfield Jr., former Assistant Secretary of State for Political-Military Affairs
Joe Donnelly, former U.S. Senator from Indiana
Victor H. Fazio, former U.S. Representative from California
Al From, founder and former CEO of the Democratic Leadership Council
Dario Frommer, former majority leader of the California State Assembly
Vernon Jordan Jr., former adviser to President Bill Clinton
Ileana Ros-Lehtinen, former U.S. Representative from Florida
Lamar Smith, former U.S. Representative from Texas
John E. Sununu, former U.S. Senator from New Hampshire
Tommy Thompson, former governor of Wisconsin and U.S. Secretary of Health and Human Services
Filemon Vela, Jr., former U.S. Representative from Texas

Alumni
George P. Bush, Commissioner of the Texas General Land Office
Joaquín Castro, U.S. Representative, Texas' 20th Congressional District
Julián Castro, former San Antonio mayor, former U.S. Secretary of Housing and Urban Development, candidate for 2020 Democratic presidential nomination
Alan D. Cohn, former Assistant Secretary for Strategy, Planning, Analysis & Risk of the United States Department of Homeland Security
Antonio Delgado, Lieutenant Governor of New York
John M. Dowd, former U.S. Attorney, wrote Dowd Report and legal advisor to President Donald Trump
Ben Fountain, award-winning fiction writer
Savannah Guthrie, co-anchor, The Today Show''
Kay Hagan, former U.S. Senator from North Carolina
Ken Mehlman, former chair, Republican National Committee
Patricia Millett, judge, U.S. Court of Appeals for the District of Columbia Circuit
Bill Paxon, former U.S. Representative from New York
Michele A. Roberts, executive director, National Basketball Players Association.
Todd Wagner, co-founder of Broadcast.com, and businessman

See also
List of largest United States-based law firms by profits per partner

References

External links
Firm website

Dupont Circle
Law firms established in 1945
Law firms based in Washington, D.C.
1945 establishments in Texas
Foreign law firms with offices in Hong Kong